The International Violin Competition of Indianapolis (IVCI) is a classical violin competition which takes place once every four years in Indianapolis, Indiana. Since its founding in 1982, "The Indianapolis" has been regarded as the Olympics of the Violin, and dubbed "the ultimate violin contest" by the Chicago Tribune.

History 

Founded in 1982 under the artistic guidance of Josef Gingold and Founding Director Thomas J. Beczkiewicz, the IVCI became recognized by the World Federation of International Music Competitions and has been a member of that federation since 1984. Gingold, an esteemed professor of violin at the Jacobs School of Music at Indiana University in Bloomington, IN, had served on the juries of every major violin competition in the world and became the IVCI's Founding Artistic Director. In 1994, artistic leadership passed to one of his most well-known pupils, Jaime Laredo, who retains the title of Jury President to this day.

For the 10th Quadrennial Competition in September 2018, the prize for the Gold Medal winner included a cash prize of US$30,000, a 24K Gold Medal, and a recital debut at Carnegie Hall's Stern Auditorium. The Gold, Silver and bronze medalists receive career management for four years, and Laureates have the opportunity to use one of several instruments owned by the IVCI, including the 1683 "ex-Gingold" Stradivarius violin.

Competition 

The competition is typically composed of four parts:

 Preliminaries (40 participants). The first round consists of a 45-minute recital, concentrating on J.S. Bach's Sonatas and partitas for solo violin, violin sonatas by Mozart, plus two of Paganini's 24 Caprices for Solo Violin or Paganiniana by Nathan Milstein. Each participant must also perform one encore work.
 Semi-Finals (16 participants). Each participant performs a 75-minute recital consisting of any violin sonata by Beethoven, plus two additional works (typically with piano accompaniment). Each participant is given a list of over sixty works from which to choose. Included in this round is a compulsory work, commissioned specifically for each Competition.
 Classical Finals (6 participants).  Each Finalist performs a violin concerto by Mozart or Haydn, plus an encore work by Fritz Kreisler, performed with a chamber orchestra.
Finals (6 participants). Each Finalist performs one of 21 major violin concertos with the Indianapolis Symphony Orchestra.

Commissioned Works

Past Winners (Laureates) 

From the competition website.

Jury Members 

* IVCI Laureate

†Unable to attend

Juried Exhibition of Student Art (JESA)
The Juried Exhibition of Student Art (JESA) is one of the most far-reaching multi-disciplinary art projects for grades one through twelve in the state of Indiana. Held in conjunction with the Quadrennial International Violin Competition of Indianapolis, the 2018 JESA involved over 26,600 school children and 169 art teachers throughout the state. JESA is one of the few programs that awards a cash prize to each school or sponsoring organization of the Grand Award Winners as well as to the students. The IVCI awarded $10,000 in prizes to outstanding artists and their schools or sponsoring organizations in 2018.

The program was designed to affirm the highest standards of visual arts; to encourage the pursuit of visual arts as a career; to help integrate the disciplines of the performing and the visual arts; to increase community support for the arts; and to heighten student awareness of the IVCI and its cultural importance to the entire state.

References

External links 
 Official Competition Website

Violin competitions
Music competitions in the United States
Non-profit organizations based in Indianapolis